</noinclude>

Alejandro "Álex" Rey Lugilde (born 29 January 1998) is a Spanish footballer who plays for Unionistas de Salamanca CF on loan from CD Lugo as a central midfielder.

Club career
Born in Lugo, Galicia, Rey represented Deportivo de La Coruña and RC Celta de Vigo as a youth. On 8 August 2017, after finishing his formation, he was loaned to Tercera División side UD Somozas for one year.

Rey made his senior debut on 20 August 2017, playing the last 20 minutes in a 5–0 home routing of CD Arenteiro. He scored his first goal on 15 October, netting the opener in a 2–0 away defeat of CD Cultural Areas, and finished the campaign as a regular starter.

On 31 August 2018, Rey joined CD Lugo and was assigned to the farm team also in the fourth division. He made his first team debut the following 14 April, coming on as a late substitute for Josete in a 4–0 routing at Córdoba CF in the Segunda División.

On 15 September 2020, Rey was loaned to Segunda División B side Unionistas de Salamanca CF for the 2020–21 season.

Personal life
Rey's older brother Javier is also a footballer. A winger, both play together at Polvorín.

References

External links

1998 births
Living people
Spanish footballers
Footballers from Lugo
Association football midfielders
Segunda División players
Tercera División players
Celta de Vigo B players
UD Somozas players
Polvorín FC players
CD Lugo players
Unionistas de Salamanca CF players